Luggate is a small town in the South Island of New Zealand.

The Luggate 'Grandview Bridge' is a local icon listed highly in the Queenstown Lakes District Council's Historic Register. It was opened on October 28, 1915, and has been described as "one of the most attractively proportioned steel truss road bridges in the country." It is 103.7 metres long, and features a 61-metre Baltimore through truss, another 30.5m truss and a 12.2m rolled steel joist end span.

Demographics
Luggate is described by Statistics New Zealand as a rural settlement. It is part of the Upper Clutha Valley statistical area.

Luggate had a population of 474 at the 2018 New Zealand census, an increase of 195 people (69.9%) since the 2013 census, and an increase of 285 people (150.8%) since the 2006 census. There were 162 households. There were 243 males and 231 females, giving a sex ratio of 1.05 males per female, with 114 people (24.1%) aged under 15 years, 60 (12.7%) aged 15 to 29, 243 (51.3%) aged 30 to 64, and 51 (10.8%) aged 65 or older.

Ethnicities were 91.8% European/Pākehā, 10.1% Māori, 0.6% Pacific peoples, 3.8% Asian, and 1.3% other ethnicities (totals add to more than 100% since people could identify with multiple ethnicities).

Although some people objected to giving their religion, 69.0% had no religion, 20.9% were Christian, 0.6% were Hindu, 0.6% were Buddhist and 1.3% had other religions.

Of those at least 15 years old, 66 (18.3%) people had a bachelor or higher degree, and 51 (14.2%) people had no formal qualifications. The employment status of those at least 15 was that 219 (60.8%) people were employed full-time, 63 (17.5%) were part-time, and 3 (0.8%) were unemployed.

Upper Clutha Valley

Upper Clutha Valley had a population of 1,257 at the 2018 New Zealand census, an increase of 378 people (43.0%) since the 2013 census, and an increase of 606 people (93.1%) since the 2006 census. There were 426 households. There were 636 males and 621 females, giving a sex ratio of 1.02 males per female. The median age was 37.6 years (compared with 37.4 years nationally), with 315 people (25.1%) aged under 15 years, 156 (12.4%) aged 15 to 29, 684 (54.4%) aged 30 to 64, and 102 (8.1%) aged 65 or older.

Ethnicities were 94.5% European/Pākehā, 7.6% Māori, 2.9% Asian, and 1.7% other ethnicities (totals add to more than 100% since people could identify with multiple ethnicities).

The proportion of people born overseas was 22.7%, compared with 27.1% nationally.

Although some people objected to giving their religion, 69.7% had no religion, 21.7% were Christian, 0.5% were Hindu, 0.5% were Buddhist and 1.7% had other religions.

Of those at least 15 years old, 249 (26.4%) people had a bachelor or higher degree, and 99 (10.5%) people had no formal qualifications. The median income was $37,400, compared with $31,800 nationally. 168 people (17.8%) earned over $70,000 compared to 17.2% nationally. The employment status of those at least 15 was that 558 (59.2%) people were employed full-time, 174 (18.5%) were part-time, and 6 (0.6%) were unemployed.

References

Populated places in Otago
Queenstown-Lakes District